The 1934 BYU Cougars football team was an American football team that represented Brigham Young University (BYU) as a member of the Rocky Mountain Conference (RMC) during the 1934 college football season. In their seventh season under head coach G. Ott Romney, the Cougars compiled an overall record of 4–5 with a mark of 3–5 against conference opponents, finished seventh in the RMC, and were outscored by a total of 169 to 144.

Schedule

References

BYU
BYU Cougars football seasons
BYU Cougars football